This is a non-exhaustive list of shipwrecks located in or around Hong Kong by year.

1835

1841 

The Nautical Magazine and Naval Chronicle for 1842 states that the Typhoon of 1841 resulted in the total loss of 9 vessels: 2 barques, 1 ship, 1 brig, 4 schooners and the cutter HMS Louisa. In addition to this, a great number of smaller harbour going craft and Tanka boats were completely destroyed. 4 other large vessels and 6 prize junks were driven ashore and wrecked with the prize junks mostly wrecked on and around Cawee-Chow (Likely at modern-day Kau Yi Chau). 10 other ships were dismasted including HMS Sulphur, HMS Royalist and HMS Hebe. 11 ships suffered losses of bowsprits or one or more masts and 2 lost their rudders. Destruction also ravaged various shore establishments and it was estimated that around 300 people lost their lives in the disaster.

1843

1846

1847

1848

1855

1874

1906

1908

1936

1937

1941

1947

1962

1971

1972

1983

2008

2012

See also 
 List of missing ships
 List of maritime disasters
 :Category: Lists of shipwrecks by year

References 

Hong Kong
Lists of transport accidents and incidents